Lev Ivanovich Oshanin (May 30, 1912 – December 30, 1996) was a poet, author of over 70 books of poetry, novels and poetry plays winner of the Stalin Prize of the first degree (1950) and winner of the World Festival of Youth and Students.

References

External links 

 Lev I. Oshanin Russian Wikipedia Article

External links
 Oshanin.ouc.ru

1912 births
1996 deaths
People from Rybinsk
People from Rybinsky Uyezd
Communist Party of the Soviet Union members
Soviet poets
Soviet male writers
20th-century Russian male writers
Russian male poets
Russian-language poets
Russian songwriters
Soviet songwriters
Socialist realism writers
Soviet people of World War II
Stalin Prize winners
Recipients of the Order of Lenin
Burials at Vagankovo Cemetery